The Korean Government Scholarship Program, or KGSP, is an academic scholarship funded and managed by the  (NIIED), a branch of the Ministry of Education in South Korea. This scholarship provides non-Korean scholars (or overseas Koreans who fulfil certain criteria) with the funding and opportunity to conduct undergraduate or postgraduate level studies in South Korea after completing one year of intensive Korean language studies. Since its conception in 1967, over 3,000 students from 148 countries have successfully completed the scholarship program.

Overview 

The Korean Government Scholarship Program is designed to bring overseas talent to South Korea, and to integrate the scholars into Korean culture and society. If accepted, each scholar typically spends one year in South Korea learning the Korean language, followed by a 2 - 4 year university program, depending on their level of studies. In 2015, 820 students from 162 countries were accepted into the scholarship program. However, 270 scholars failed to obtain their degree in the years 2011 - 2015, citing language and cultural barriers.

Each scholar is provided financial support by the Korean government in the form of a monthly allowance. Undergraduate students receive 800,000 KRW a month whereas graduate students receive 900,000 KRW a month. In addition, NIIED provides airfare to student to and from their home country at the beginning and end of the program. Stipends and other allowances are also given to each scholar.

Language Program 

Prior to starting their degree studies, KGSP scholars are required to take one year of intensive language studies at a designated language institute. All scholars are required to obtain at least level 3 (intermediate) in the Test of Proficiency in Korean (TOPIK) before they can continue to their degree studies. According to NIIED, TOPIK level 3 allows the individual to "perform basic linguistic functions necessary to use various public facilities and maintain social relationships."

The normal duration for the language program is one year, but it can be waived, shortened or extended depending on the scholar's TOPIK results. Scholars who have previously obtained a TOPIK level of 5 or 6 (advanced) are exempted from the language program, and are required to start their studies immediately. If a scholar obtains TOPIK 5 or 6 within the first six months of the language program, then they are required to start their studies at the beginning of the next semester, reducing their time at the language institute by six months. Additionally, scholars who fail to achieve TOPIK 3 after one year of language studies cannot proceed to their degree studies, and must do another six months of language study at their language institute. Students may not leave South Korea during the language program so that they may concentrate on their studies. However, exceptions are made in case of emergencies and family matters .

The language institute is designated by NIIED and cannot be changed. The language institutes include schools like Keimyung University and Dongseo University, and are typically in a different city than the school chosen for the degree program. This gives each scholar the opportunity to explore multiple cities within South Korea.

Those without a resident visa are required to have a D-4 visa to undergo language studies.

University Studies 

During the application process, scholars choose a program and university for their degree program which cannot be changed, barring extreme circumstances. The scholarship program allocates four years for scholars pursuing their bachelor's degree, two years for a master's degree and three years for a PhD. The graduation requirements for each scholar is dependent on their program and university.

Scholars who have TOPIK level 5 or greater are granted an additional 100,000 KRW a month for their monthly allowance during their degree studies. Additional money is given to scholars in postgraduate research based fields.

Those without a resident visa are required to have a D-2 visa to undergo their studies.

Participating Countries 

As of 2014, citizens from 157 countries are able to apply for KGSP.

Eligible Universities 

As of 2014, 60 universities are designated by NIIED as eligible institutions for postgraduate degree studies.

See also 
 Scholarships in Korea
 Education in South Korea

External links 
National Institute for International Education
Study in Korea

References 

Scholarships in South Korea
Education in South Korea
Government scholarships